The Fondation pour l'audition is a French scientific foundation for research about hearing impairment. The foundation is located in the 12th arrondissement of Paris.

Overview 
The Fondation pour l'audition was created in 2015 by Françoise Bettencourt Meyers, Jean-Pierre Meyers and the Fondation Bettencourt Schueller.

The foundation receives a grant from the Fondation de France.

The foundation welcomes Doctors from Denmark, United States, Belgium, United Kingdom and France.

References

External links
 Official Website

Non-profit organizations based in France
Foundations based in France
2015 establishments in France
Hearing
Educational institutions established in 2015
Scientific organizations established in 2015